is a Japanese animator and director. She was born in Saitama Prefecture. Her name is sometimes misromanized as Seiko Sayama.

Works

TV Anime
Nintama Rantarou (1993–1994) - Storyboard, Episode Director
Tama & Friends (1994) - Storyboard, Episode Director
Soar High! Isami (1994–1996) - Storyboard, Episode Director
Harimogu Harley (1996) - Director
Saber Marionette J to X (1998) - Chief Director, Storyboard (eps 1, 3, 6, 8–9, 11-25 odd), Episode Director (eps 1, 6, 9, 13, 17, 19, 21, 25), Background Art (ep 12), Illustration (ep 26), Key Animation (eps 9, 25), Photography Assistant (ED for ep. 25)
Magic User's Club (1999) - Storyboard, Episode Director
Now and Then, Here and There (1999–2000) - Storyboard
Hunter × Hunter (1999–2001) - Storyboard
Tsukikage Ran (2000) - Storyboard
Boys Be... (2000) - Special Thanks
Gravitation (2000–2001) - Storyboard, Episode Director
Prétear (2001) - Director
Shiawase Sou no Okojo-san (2001–2002) - Storyboard, Episode Director
Seven of Seven (2002) - Storyboard
Ai Yori Aoshi (2002) - Storyboard
Chobits (2002) - Storyboard
King of Bandit Jing (2002) - Episode Director
Princess Tutu (2002–2003) - Storyboard, Episode Director
Galaxy Angel A (2002–2003) - Storyboard
Last Exile (2003) - Storyboard
Kaleido Star (2003) - Storyboard, Episode Director
Jubei-chan 2 (2004) - Storyboard
Uta Kata (2004) - Storyboard
Sgt. Frog (2004–2011) - Storyboard
Fushigiboshi no Futagohime (2005–2006) - Storyboard
Blood+ (2005–2006) - Storyboard, Episode Director
ARIA The NATURAL (2006) - Storyboard, Episode Director
Nana (2006) - Storyboard
Bokura ga Ita (2006) - Storyboard
Skip Beat! (2008) - Director
Vampire Knight (2008) - Director, Storyboard (OP1,ED1; eps 1, 3, 7, 13), Episode Director (OP1,ED1; ep 1)
Vampire Knight Guilty (2008) - Director, Storyboard (OP, ED; eps 3, 6, 10, 13), Episode Director (OP, ED)
Brave 10 (2012) - Director
No Game No Life (2014) - Storyboard (eps. 5, 10)
Flying Witch (2016) - Storyboard (eps. 5, 10), Episode Director (eps. 5, 10)
A Place Further than the Universe (2018) - Storyboard (ep. 11)
Amanchu! Advance (2018) - Director
To Your Eternity 2nd Season (2022–2023) - Director

OVA
Miyuki-chan in Wonderland (1995) - Director (episode 1)
Angel Sanctuary (2000) - Director

References

External links
Kiyoko Sayama official website

Anime directors
Living people
People from Saitama Prefecture
Year of birth missing (living people)